Roger Petit (17 August 1922 – 2011) was a Belgian fencer. He competed in the team sabre event at the 1960 Summer Olympics.

References

1922 births
2011 deaths
Belgian male fencers
Belgian sabre fencers
Olympic fencers of Belgium
Fencers at the 1960 Summer Olympics